Michel Mongeau (c. 1946 – 11 November 2020) was a Canadian actor.

Radio
From 1989 to 1997, Mongeau talked on 275-Allô, a daily radio show for 6 to 12 year olds broadcast on Ici Radio-Canada Première in the early evenings.

Filmography

Dubbing
The Bronswik Affair (1978)
Oliver & Company (1988)
100 dessins dessous (1996)
Prince of Persia: The Sands of Time (2003)

References

External links

1946 births
2020 deaths
Canadian male film actors
20th-century Canadian male actors
21st-century Canadian male actors
Canadian male television actors
Male actors from Quebec
French Quebecers